The Movable Book Society (MBS) is a nonprofit organization which provides a forum for artists, book sellers, book producers, collectors, curators, and others to share enthusiasm and exchange information about pop-up and movable books. The Society has nearly 450 members worldwide.

History
In 1993, Rutgers University librarian Ann R. Montanaro  published Pop-up and Movable Books: A Bibliography. The volume of correspondences from collectors who purchased the book convinced Montanaro that there was abundant interest in movable books to form an organization of collectors, and thus she founded The Movable Book Society later that year. MBS hosts opportunities for members to meet in person and publishes a quarterly newsletter.

Publications
Movable Stationery:
Movable Stationery is a quarterly publication featuring articles about movable and pop-up book history and collecting, surveys and reviews of new titles, information about exhibits, workshops and profiles of collectors and paper engineers. Digitized back issues (1993 – 2013) are available from the Smithsonian Libraries.

Brooklyn Pops Up:
In 2000, the MBS and the Brooklyn Public Library created an exhibit called “Brooklyn Pops Up! The History and Art of the Movable Book” and published Brooklyn Pops Up, a pop-up book featuring eight Brooklyn landmarks designed by paper engineers such as David A. Carter, Carla Dijs, Bruce Foster, Kees Moerbeek, Robert Sabuda, Ken Wilson-Max and others. Maurice Sendak did the cover art which was made movable by Matthew Reinhart. Brooklyn Pops Up is in its 5th printing.

The Movable Book Society: A Celebration of Pop-up and Movable Books: Published in 2004, the commemorative, limited edition book explores 700 years of movable book history and contains 11 full-color pop-ups and movables, including reproductions from historical paper engineers such as Geraldine Clyne, Dean & Son, S. Louis Giraud, Vojtěch Kubašta, Harold B. Lentz, Lothar Meggendorfer, Ernest Nister, Matthew Paris, Ib Penick, Robert Sayer, and Julian Wehr.

A to Z: Marvels in Paper Engineering:
In 2018, the Movable Book Society published a special collection of 26 individual pop-up cards to commemorate its 25th anniversary.  Each card represented a unique letter from the English alphabet and was designed by paper engineers from the U.S. and abroad.

Conferences
Every two years, since 1996, the Movable Book Society meets in person for a multi-day conference. Past events have been held in Los Angeles, Salt Lake City, New York City, Philadelphia and Boston. Past speakers have included various paper engineers and book artists, such as Sally Blakemore, Julie Chen (book artist), Chuck Fischer, Theo Gielen, Colette Fu, Edward H. Hutchins, Paul Johnson.

Awards and grants
The Movable Book Society presents awards at its biennial conferences:

Meggendorfer Prize for the Best Paper Engineering – Trade Publications: Named in honor of Lothar Meggendorfer (1847-1925), a legendary 19th century illustrator and movable books paper engineer. This award is given for the most outstanding commercially published pop-up or movable book issues in the two proceedings years.

Meggendorfer Prize for Artist Books: This prize honors the best pop-up and movable artist book created in the past three years.

Emerging Paper Engineer Prize: This honor recognizes excellence in paper engineering among undergraduate and/or graduate students.

MBS Lifetime Achievement Award: This honor recognizes an individual who has made significant contributions to the field of movable books.

Exhibitions
The Movable Book Society has sponsored various exhibitions over the years:

• Stand & Deliver: Engineering Sculpture Into a Book Format, 2004, curated by Edward Hutchins. The exhibit, co-sponsored with the Brookfield Craft Center, was held at various locations including San Diego Mesa College, Wimberly Library at Florida Atlantic University, the Denver Public Library and Columbia College Chicago Center for Book and Paper Arts. A catalog and interactive CD were published.

• Pop-Up Books from the Collection of the Movable Book Society, 2001, Great Hall of the Westport Library, Westport, CT

• Brooklyn Pops Up! The History and Art of the Movable Book, 2000, Brooklyn Public Library. The exhibition began at the Central Library, before touring 24 neighborhood branches. "The Brooklyn Public Library has spent more than $70,000 in state grants to organize Brooklyn Pops Up an elaborate exhibition featuring more than 100 pop-ups or movable books... [the exhibit catalog] nearly sold out its first printing of more than 16,500."

References

External links 

 

Artists' books
Book arts
Books by type
Children's books
Paper art
Pop-up book artists
Pop-up book
Bibliophiles
Book_clubs
Children's literature organizations
501(c)(3) organizations
Organizations established in 1993